Mór ingen Donnchadha was the Queen of Ireland. She died in 986 AD.

See also

 Mór (Irish name)

Notes and references

10th-century Irish people
10th-century Irish women
Irish royal consorts
986 deaths
Year of birth unknown